El Shaddai ( ʾĒl Šadday) or just Shaddai is one of the names of the God of Israel. El Shaddai is conventionally translated into English as God Almighty (Deus Omnipotens in Latin, الله عز وجل Allāh 'azzawajal in Arabic), but its original meaning is unclear. 
The translation of El as "God" or "Lord" in the Ugaritic/Canaanite language is straightforward, as El was the supreme god of the ancient Canaanite religion. The literal meaning of Shaddai, however, is the subject of debate.

The form of the phrase El Shaddai fits the pattern of the divine names in the Ancient Near East, exactly as is the case with names like El Olam", El Elyon" or El Betel". As such, El Shaddai can convey several different semantic relations between the two words, among them: the deity of a place called Shaddai, a deity possessing the quality of shaddai and a deity who is also known by the name Shaddai.

Occurrence
The name Shaddai appears 48 times in the Bible, seven times as "El Shaddai" (five times in Genesis, once in Exodus, and once in Ezekiel).

According to  Shaddai was the name by which God was known to Abraham, Isaac, and Jacob. Shaddai thus being associated in tradition with Abraham, the inclusion of the Abraham stories into the Hebrew Bible may have brought the northern name with them, according to the documentary hypothesis of the origins of the Hebrew Bible.

In the vision of Balaam recorded in the Book of Numbers 24:4 and 16, the vision comes from Shaddai, who is also referred to as El (God) and Elyon (Most High). In the fragmentary inscriptions at Deir Alla, though "Shaddai" is not, or not fully present, shaddayin appear (the vowels are uncertain, as is the gemination of the "d"), perhaps lesser figurations of Shaddai. These have been tentatively identified with the šedim of Deuteronomy 32:17 and Psalm 106:37–38, who are Canaanite deities.

The name Shaddai is often used in parallel to El later in the Book of Job.

In the Septuagint Shaddai or El Shaddai was often translated just as "God" or "my God", and in at least one passage (Ezekiel 10:5) it is transliterated (""). In other places (such as Job 5:17) it is translated "Almighty" (""), and this word is used in other translations as well (such as the King James Bible).

Etymology
The origin and meaning of "Shaddai" are obscure, and a variety of hypotheses have been put forward.

Shaddai related to wilderness or mountains
According to Ernst Knauf, "El Shaddai" means "God of the Wilderness" and originally would not have had a doubled "d". He argues that it is a loanword from Israelian Hebrew, where the word had a "sh" sound, into Judean Hebrew and hence, Biblical Hebrew, where it would have been śaday with the sound śin. In this theory, the word is related to the word śadé meaning "the (uncultivated) field", the area of hunting (as in the distinction between beasts of the field, and cattle). He points out that the name is found in Thamudic inscriptions (as 'lšdy), in a personal name "Śaday`ammī" used in Egypt from the Late Bronze Age until Achaemenid times, and even in the Punic name "bdšd" (Servant of Shadé or Shada).

Another theory is that Shaddai is a derivation of a Semitic stem that appears in the Akkadian language shadû ("mountain") and shaddā`û or shaddû`a ("mountain-dweller"), one of the names of Amurru. This theory was popularized by W. F. Albright but was somewhat weakened when it was noticed that the doubling of the medial d  is first documented only in the Neo-Assyrian period. However, the doubling in Hebrew might possibly be secondary. According to this theory, God is seen as inhabiting a holy mountain, a concept not unknown in ancient West Asian mythology (see El), and also evident in the Syriac Christianity writings of Ephrem the Syrian, who places the Garden of Eden on an inaccessible mountaintop.

The term "El Shaddai" may mean "god of the mountains", referring to the Mesopotamian divine mountain. This could also refer to the Israelite camp's stay at biblical Mount Sinai where God gave Moses the Ten Commandments. According to Stephen L. Harris, the term was "one of the patriarchal names for the Mesopotamian tribal god", presumably meaning of the tribe of Abram, although there seems to be no evidence for this outside the Bible. In Exodus 6:3, El Shaddai is identified explicitly with the God of Abraham and with Yahweh. The term "El Shaddai" appears chiefly in Genesis.

Shaddai meaning destroyer
The root word "shadad" means to plunder, overpower, or make desolate. This would give Shaddai the meaning of "destroyer", representing one of the aspects of God, and in this context it is essentially an epithet. The meaning may go back to an original sense which was "to be strong" as in the Arabic "shadid" "strong", although normally the Arabic letter pronounced "sh" corresponds to the Hebrew letter sin, not to shin. The termination "ai", typically signifying the first person possessive plural, functions as a pluralis excellentiae like other titles for the Hebrew deity, Elohim ("gods") and Adonai ("my lords"). The possessive quality of the termination had lost its sense and become the lexical form of both Shaddai and Adonai, similar to how the connotation of the French word Monsieur changed from "my lord" to being an honorific title. There are a couple of verses in the Bible where there seems to be word play with "Shadday" and this root meaning to destroy (the day of YHWH will come as destruction from Shadday, כשד משדי יבוא, Is. 13:6 and Joel 1:15), but Knauf maintains that this is re-etymologization.

Shaddai as a toponym
It has been speculated that the tell in Syria called Tell eth-Thadeyn ("tell of the three breasts") was called Shaddai in the Amorite language. There was a Bronze-Age city in the region called Tuttul, which means "three breasts" in the Sumerian language. It has been conjectured that El Shaddai was therefore the "God of Shaddai" and that the inclusion of the Abrahamic stories into the Hebrew Bible may have brought the northern name with them (see Documentary hypothesis).

Shaddai meaning breasts 
The root "shad" means "breast". Biblical scholar David Biale notes that, of the six times that the name "El Shaddai" appears in the Book of Genesis, five are in connection with fertility blessings for the patriarchs. He argues that this original understanding of "Shaddai" as related to fertility was forgotten by the later authors of Isaiah, Joel, and Job, who understood it as related to root words for power or destruction (thus explaining their later translation as "all-powerful" or "almighty").

Shaddai in the later Jewish tradition

God that said "enough" 
A popular interpretation of the name Shaddai is that it is composed of the Hebrew relative particle she- (Shin plus vowel segol followed by dagesh), or, as in this case, as sha- (Shin plus vowel patach followed by a dagesh). The noun containing the dagesh is the Hebrew word dai meaning "enough, sufficient, sufficiency". This is the same word used in the Passover Haggadah, Dayeinu, which means "It would have been enough for us." The song Dayeinu celebrates the various miracles God performed while liberating the Israelites from Egyptian servitude. The Talmud explains it this way, but says that "Shaddai" stands for "Mi she'Amar Dai L'olamo" – "He who said 'Enough' to His world." When he was forming the earth, he stopped the process at a certain point, withholding creation from reaching its full completion, and thus the name embodies God's power to stop creation. The passage appears in the tractate Hagigah 12a and reads:Reish Laqish said: What is the meaning of that which is written: "I am the Almighty God" (El Shaddai) (Genesis 35:11)? It means: I am He who said to the world "enough! [dai]," instructing it to stop expanding. Similarly, Reish Laqish [also] said: In the hour that the Holy One, blessed be He, created the sea, it started to expand – until the Holy One, blessed be He, reproached it. [Then] it dried out as it was said: He reproaches the sea and makes it dry; and all the rivers makes desolate (Nahum 1:4).This account has two parallel variants with some minute changes. One appears in Bereshit Rabbah 5:8, where Shaddai stops the world from expanding and in 46:3 where he limits the earth and heavens. What is common to all these instances is the cosmogonic context and the exposition provided by Resh Laqish, who explains the appellation as a compound form consisting of she– and day. These passages have often been exposed in a sophisticated way as indicating the divine plan of drawing the borders between mind and matter, keeping the balance between his right and left hand or as an early manifestation of the kabbalistic idea of tzimtzum. It seems however, that they should rather be approached in their immediate context and in relation to another parallel narrative which comes in BT Sukkah 53 a–b and reads:When David dug the Pits, the {watery chasm} arose and threatened to submerge the world. David asked: «is there anyone who knows whether it is allowed to inscribe the [divine] name upon a {piece of clay}, and cast it into the {watery chasm} that its waves would subside?" (…) He thereupon inscribed the name upon a {piece of clay}, cast (Aram. שדי) it into the {watery chasm} and it subsided sixteen thousand cubits.This story has its variants: in Makkot 11a David sees the tehom rising and stops it by means of the name inscribed upon a stone while Bereshit Rabbah 23:7 conveys the tradition that this was the abuse of the tetragram which brought about the flood. If to approach these passages from the structural perspective, it is possible to discern two basic essences engaged in the opposition: the active, dividing agent and passive amorphous matter. Moreover, each of the recalled accounts has strong cosmological undertones, what suggests assuming the comparative perspective. Accordingly, Shaddai limiting the expansionist outburst of the world fits well the pattern of the so-called chaoskampf – an initial divine battle followed by the triumph of the young and vivacious deity, subjugating the hostile, usually aquatic monster and building the palace or creating the cosmos.The mythological traditions of the ancient Near East are full of parallels: Babylonian Marduk and Tiamat, Ugaritic Baal and Yam, Egyptian Ra and Apep, etc. In fact, this rabbinic reiteration should not be surprising at all, given the semantic capacity of this myth. Not only does the Hebrew Bible recall the cosmic battle numerous times, especially in Psalms (e.g., 77:16–17; 89:10) and Prophets (e.g. Isaiah 51:9–10; Ezekiel 32:13) but also plays with this ancient motif reiterating it to convey a specific meaning. Yahveh blowing the waters of the flood in Genesis 8:1 to make place for the new creation or dividing the Sea of Reeds in Exodus 14–15 to let the Hebrews walk to the other side and start a new national existence – all of these may be read as the retellings of the initial cosmogonic conflict.

"El Shaddai" may also be understood as an allusion to the singularity of deity, "El", as opposed to "Elohim" (plural), being sufficient or enough for the early patriarchs of Judaism. To this was later added the Mosaic conception of the tetragrammaton YHWH, meaning a god who is sufficient in himself, that is, a self-determined eternal being qua being, for whom limited descriptive names cannot apply. This may have been the meaning the Hebrew phrase "ehyeh asher ehyeh" (which translates as "I will be that which I will be") and which is how God describes himself to Moses in Exodus 3:13–15. This phrase can be applied to the tetragrammaton YHWH, which can be understood as an anagram for the three states of being: past, present and future, conjoined with the conjunctive Hebrew letter vav.

There is early support for this interpretation, in that the Septuagint translates "Shadday" in several places as "ὁ ἱκανός", the Sufficient One (for example, Ruth 1:20, 21).

Apotropaic usage of the name "Shaddai" 
The name "Shaddai" often appears on the devices such as amulets or dedicatory plaques. More importantly, however, it is associated with the traditional Jewish customs which could be understood as apotropaic: male circumcision, mezuzah and tefillin. The connections of the first one with the name Shaddai are twofold. According to the biblical chronology it is El Shaddai who ordains the custom of circumcision in Genesis 17:1 and, as is apparent in midrash Tanhuma Tzav 14 (cf. a parallel passages in Tazri‘a 5 and Shemini 5) the brit milah itself is the inscription of the part of the name on the body:The Holy One, blessed be He, has put His name on them so they would enter the garden of Eden. And what is the name and the seal that He had put on them? It is "Shaddai". [The letter] shin He put in the nose, dalet – on the hand, whereas yod on the {circumcised} [membrum]. Accordingly, {when} He goes to {His eternal home} (Ecclesiastes 12:5), there is an angel {appointed} in the garden of Eden who picks up every son of which is circumcised and brings him {there}. And those who are not circumcised? Although there are two letters of the name "Shaddai" present on them, {namely} shin from the nose and dalet from the hand, the yod (…) is {missing}. Therefore it hints at a demon (Heb. shed), which brings him down to Gehenna.Analogous is the case with mezuzah – a piece of parchment with two passages from the Book of Deuteronomy, curled up in a small encasement and affixed to a doorframe. At least since the Geonic times, the name "Shaddai" is often written on the back of the parchment containing the shema‘ and sometimes also on the casing itself. The name is traditionally interpreted as being an acronym of shomer daltot Yisrael ("the guardian of the doors of Israel") or shomer dirot Yisrael ("the guardian of the dwellings of Israel"). However, this notarikon itself has its source most probably in Zohar Va’ethanan where it explains the meaning of the word Shaddai and connects it to mezuzah.

The name "Shadday" can also be found on tefillin – a set of two black leather boxes strapped to head and arm during the prayers. The binding of particular knots of tefillin is supposed to resemble the shape of the letters: the leather strap of the tefillah shel rosh is knotted at the back of the head thus forming the letter dalet whereas the one that is passed through the tefillah shel yad forms a yod-shaped knot. In addition to this, the box itself is inscribed with the letter shin on two of its sides.

Biblical translations 
The Septuagint (and other early translations) sometimes translate "Shaddai" as "(the) Almighty". It is often translated as "God", "my God", or "Lord". However, in the Greek of the Septuagint translation of Psalm 91:1, "Shaddai" is translated as "the God of heaven".

"Almighty" is the translation of "Shaddai" followed by most modern English translations of the Hebrew scriptures, including the popular New International Version and Good News Bible.

The translation team behind the New Jerusalem Bible (N.J.B.) however, maintains that the meaning is uncertain, and that translating "El Shaddai" as "Almighty God" is inaccurate. The N.J.B. leaves it untranslated as "Shaddai", and makes footnote suggestions that it should perhaps be understood as "God of the Mountain" from the Akkadian "shadu", or "God of the open wastes" from the Hebrew "sadeh" and the secondary meaning of the Akkadian word.
The translation in the Concordant Old Testament is 'El Who-Suffices' (Genesis 17:1).

In Mandaeism
In Book 5, Chapter 2 of the Right Ginza, part of Mandaean holy scripture of the Ginza Rabba, El Shaddai is mentioned as ʿIl-Šidai.

Use by Bunyan
God is referred to as "Shaddai" throughout the 1682 Christian allegorical book, The Holy War by John Bunyan.

References

External links 

 

Book of Genesis
Book of Exodus
Book of Ezekiel
Names of God in Judaism
Deities in the Hebrew Bible
Names of God in Christianity
El (deity)